Pectis filipes, the fivebract cinchweed, is a summer blooming annual plant of the genus Pectis. It occurs in Texas, New Mexico, Arizona, and northern Mexico.

Pectis filipes is the more southern species of Pectis found in the Gila National Forest.

References

filipes
Flora of Arizona
Flora of Texas
Flora of Mexico
Flora of New Mexico